Lieutenant-Colonel Leslie Herbert Payne    (5 November 1888 – 23 December 1942) was an Australian politician and military officer.

He was born in Burnie, the son of Senator Herbert Payne. During the First World War, he served in the Australian Imperial Force. He was awarded the Distinguished Service Order in the 1918 New Year Honours.

In 1924, he was elected to the Tasmanian House of Assembly as a Nationalist member for Denison in a recount following Robert Snowden's resignation. He was defeated at the 1925 state election. Payne died in Hobart in 1942.

References

1888 births
1942 deaths
Nationalist Party of Australia members of the Parliament of Tasmania
Members of the Tasmanian House of Assembly
Australian Army officers
Companions of the Distinguished Service Order
20th-century Australian politicians
People from Burnie, Tasmania